UCSC Student Associations are students' group of Università Cattolica del Sacro Cuore. They organize cultural and social activities among the students of the university. Some associations are linked to Italian political parties, others are nonpartisan.

History
Università Cattolica del Sacro Cuore hosts over 50 student organizations, covering a wide range of interests. The first corporation of UCSC was Ordo Monattorum, which was founded in 1922.
There are different religious associations like Communion and Liberation, Fuci and Unione Giuristi Cattolici Italiani. In the 1968 was founded ULD - Studenti di Sinistra which was a protagonist of the protests of 1968 in Italy. Since 1968, many associations are linked to the Italian parties.

Function
Every 2 years students elect their representatives belonging to different associations. Student representation is regulated in 3 university bodies: EDUcatt, CUS Milano and school councils.

List of Student Associations
In the 5 campuses there are a lot of student associations.

Milan Campus
[[File:JECatt Logo.jpg|thumb|right|150px|Seal of JECatt]]

 AIESEC
 Ateneo Studenti
 Athenaeum
 Azione Universitaria - Movimento della Libertà
 Boulevart
 Centocanti
 Circolo Tocqueville
 Comunicando
 Comunità Antagonista Padana
 C.U.I.B. (Comitato Universitario Iniziative Di Base) d’Avanguardia
 Elsa - The European Law Students' Association
 Exchange Students And Erasmus Guide
 Formica democratica
 Giovani per EXPO 2015 Cattolica
 Gruppo Co-Raggio
 FUCI Gruppo "Giuseppe Lazzati"
 Il Cavallo Rosso
 Il Circolo Università Cattolica
 Il Fatto
 UniLab
 JECatt, junior enterprise of UCSC
 Morozzo della Rocca
 Movimento Universitario Padano
 Movit - Movimento per la Vita
 Ordo Monattorum
 Presenza studentesca Africana Dell'Università Cattolica
 Studenti Amici UC
 Studenti per le Libertà
 U.L.D. - Studenti di sinistra

Brescia Campus

 Ateneo Studenti
 CUT La Stanza
 Dafne
 Elea
 FUCI - Gruppo di Brescia
 L'Idea
 Pier Giorgio Frassati
 UCID Giovani Brescia

Rome Campus

 Ateneo Studenti
 ECO - EsserCi Ora
 FUCI
 Gli amici di Bacco
 Gruppo Phos-Laboratorio della fede
 I Soliti Ignoti
 Il Giornalone
 Know How
 MoVit - Movimento per la Vita
 Sognatori in cantiere
 Sorrisi Gemelli
 Studenti Protagonisti
 UCSC Erasmus Appointment

Piacenza-Cremona Campus

 ASUP - Associazione sportiva universitaria europea
 Ateneo Studenti
 Athenaeum
 Dialogo e rinnovamento
 FUCI UCSC Piacenza
 Giovani Europei
 Movimento Universitario Padano
 SMINT
 RINIA
 Triskele Di Azione Universitaria

Journals
Student organizations publish several magazines: L'Eco del Batacchio (Ordo Monattorum), Il Pungolo (Azione Universitaria), L'Urlo (ULD), Inside (Unilab) and Strike (Ateneo Studenti).

References

External links
 Official website

Università Cattolica del Sacro Cuore